The BMW R1250GS is a motorcycle manufactured in Berlin, Germany by BMW Motorrad, part of the BMW group. It is one of the BMW GS family of dual sport motorcycles.

History
In September 2018, Kevin Cameron wrote that a "shift cam" VVT system was destined for a 2019 model year R1250GS, and other media reported the technology was to be adopted on all the R series boxer motors. In September 2018, BMW confirmed the 2019 R1250GS and sibling R1250RT would have VVT.

Chassis

Engine
The engine displaces  with 102.5 mm bore × 76 mm stroke. The intake camshafts have two cam lobes per valve that can be switched within one cam revolution between partial-throttle and open-throttle cam profiles.

References

External links

R1250GS
Motorcycles powered by flat engines
Shaft drive motorcycles
Dual-sport motorcycles
Motorcycles introduced in 2018